William Randolph Taylor (December 21, 1895 – November 11, 1990) was an American botanist known as an expert in phycology.

Early life
Taylor was born on December 21, 1895 in Philadelphia, Pennsylvania. He attended the University of Pennsylvania to study botany, receiving his B.S. in 1916, M.S. in 1917, and Ph.D. in 1920. In 1918, he served as private in the U.S. Army during WWI.

Career
Taylor became a professor of the University of Pennsylvania in 1927. In 1930, he joined the Department of Botany of the University of Michigan teaching marine botany. His summers were primarily spent at the Marine Biological Laboratory in Woods Hole, Massachusetts. He was also Curator of Algae of the University Herbarium.

His field work involved collecting trips to the Dry Tortugas, British Columbia, the Caribbean, Pacific Mexico, Central and South America, and the Galapagos Islands. 
His lab research dealt with cytogenetics and cytotaxonomy of seaweeds, specializing in the biology and classification of freshwater and marine algae. His goal was to catalog oceanic biodiversity.

In 1946, he was brought on as a senior biologist for Operation Crossroads by the United States Navy to conduct botanical surveys of the Marshall Islands before and after the testing of atomic bombs.

Taylor was a founding member of the Phycological Society of America and served as their second President in 1947. He was Vice-President of the Botanical Society of America in 1956. He was a member of the American Academy of Arts and Sciences, the Royal Academy of Science, Letters and Fine Arts of Belgium, the Linnean Society of London, and of the French Academy of Sciences.

Selected publications
Taylor authored more than 140 works. His four principle publications are:
 
Pacific Marine Algae of the Allan Hancock Expeditions to the Galapagos Islands, 1945.

References

20th-century American botanists
University of Michigan faculty
Phycologists
United States Army personnel of World War I
1895 births
1990 deaths